NADH dehydrogenase (ubiquinone) 1 beta subcomplex, 3, 12kDa is a protein that in humans is encoded by the NDUFB3 gene. NADH dehydrogenase (ubiquinone) 1 beta subcomplex, 3, 12kDa is an accessory subunit of the NADH dehydrogenase (ubiquinone) complex, located in the mitochondrial inner membrane. It is also known as Complex I and is the largest of the five complexes of the electron transport chain. Mutations in this gene contribute to mitochondrial complex I deficiency.

Structure 

The NDUFB3 gene, located on the q arm of chromosome 2 in position 31.3, is 14,012 base pairs long. The NDUFB3 protein weighs 11.4 kDa and is composed of 98 amino acids. NDUFB3 is a subunit of the enzyme NADH dehydrogenase (ubiquinone), the largest of the respiratory complexes. The structure is L-shaped with a long, hydrophobic transmembrane domain and a hydrophilic domain for the peripheral arm that includes all the known redox centers and the NADH binding site. NDUFB3 is one of about 31 hydrophobic subunits that form the transmembrane region of Complex I. This protein localizes to the inner membrane of the mitochondrion as a single-pass membrane protein. It has been noted that the N-terminal hydrophobic domain has the potential to be folded into an alpha helix spanning the inner mitochondrial membrane with a C-terminal hydrophilic domain interacting with globular subunits of Complex I. The highly conserved two-domain structure suggests that this feature is critical for the protein function and that the hydrophobic domain acts as an anchor for the NADH dehydrogenase (ubiquinone) complex at the inner mitochondrial membrane.

Function 

The human NDUFB3 gene codes for a subunit of Complex I of the respiratory chain, which transfers electrons from NADH to ubiquinone. However, NDUFB3 is an accessory subunit of the complex that is believed not to be involved in catalysis. Initially, NADH binds to Complex I and transfers two electrons to the isoalloxazine ring of the flavin mononucleotide (FMN) prosthetic arm to form FMNH2. The electrons are transferred through a series of iron-sulfur (Fe-S) clusters in the prosthetic arm and finally to coenzyme Q10 (CoQ), which is reduced to ubiquinol (CoQH2). The flow of electrons changes the redox state of the protein, resulting in a conformational change and pK shift of the ionizable side chain, which pumps four hydrogen ions out of the mitochondrial matrix.

Clinical significance 

Mutations in the NDUFB3 gene have been implicated in the pathogenicity of human oxidative phosphorylation disease, characterized by a biochemical defect in the respiratory chain.

References

External links 
Mass spectrometry characterization of NDUFB3 at COPaKB